WRYD (97.7 FM, "Revocation Radio") is a radio station licensed to serve Jemison, Alabama, United States. The station is owned TBTA Ministries, a non-profit based in Birmingham, Alabama.

The station airs a Christian rock music format. WRYD broadcasts to Central Alabama and the southern Birmingham area. Cities also served include Clanton, Maplesville, Alabaster, Pelham, Thorsby, Helena, and Montevallo, among other communities.

In August 2003, longtime owner Southeastern Broadcasting Company, Inc., reached an agreement to sell this station to Great South RFDC, LLC. The deal was approved by the FCC on October 30, 2003, and the transaction was consummated on November 28, 2003. In January 2007, this station was acquired by Great South Wireless LLC from Great South RFDC LLC as part of a six station deal for a reported total sale price of $100 plus an assumption of certain debts and obligations.

Effective July 23, 2018, TBTA Ministries closed on the purchase of the then-WHPH from Great South Wireless for $525,000. The following day, the new owners changed the station's format from oldies to Christian rock, branded as "Revocation Radio", and then changed the call sign to WRYD on July 31, 2018.

Previous logo

References

External links

RYD
Chilton County, Alabama
RYD
Radio stations established in 1953
1953 establishments in Alabama